George Omaira (born in 1570?, Ehden, Lebanon - died in 1644) was the 53rd Patriarch of Antioch of the Maronite Church (1634-1644).

Life

Georges Omaira was born in Ehden. He was sent to Rome in 1583 to study at the Maronite College. He returned to Lebanon in 1595 under Pope Clement VIII.

In 1596, he published a Syriac and Chaldean grammar in Latin, one of the first in Europe, and also a translation of the New Testament into Syriac.

Omaira was consecrated auxiliary bishop in 1600 by Maronite Patriarch Youssef Rizzi el-Bkoufani. In 1608, became bishop of Ehden. On 26 December 1634, with the death of Patriarch Makhlouf, he was elected Maronite Patriarch of Antioch. Omaira was the first student of the Maronite College to be chosen for this position, and the first patriarch to not be from a monastic order.

Patriarch Omaira died in July 1644.

See also

List of Maronite Patriarchs
Maronite Church

References

External links
 http://www.catholic-hierarchy.org/bishop/bomaira.html

1570s births
1644 deaths
17th-century people from the Ottoman Empire
Maronite Patriarchs of Antioch
Bishops in the Ottoman Empire
17th-century Eastern Catholic archbishops
17th-century Maronite Catholic bishops